Gunnar Steinn Jónsson (born 4 May 1987) is an Icelandic handball player for IFK Kristianstad and the Icelandic national team.

References

1987 births
Living people
Gunnar Steinn Jonsson
Gunnar Steinn Jonsson
Handball-Bundesliga players
VfL Gummersbach players
IFK Kristianstad players
Expatriate handball players
Gunnar Steinn Jonsson
Gunnar Steinn Jonsson
Gunnar Steinn Jonsson